The Bernardine Sisters of St. Francis are a Roman Catholic apostolic congregation of pontifical right, based in Reading, Pennsylvania.

The order  was founded in 1894 by Mother Veronica Grzedowska, a Polish nun from Zakliczyn, for the instruction of poor girls in the parish of Mount Carmel.

As of 2010, the order had more than 380 members in more than 50 houses.

Ministries
The following are among this organization's areas of ministry:

Education (early, elementary, secondary, special, and higher)
Elder care
Foreign missions
Healthcare
Homecare
Ministry (diocesan, pastoral, retreat, social)
Outreach to the poor
Prison ministry

References

External links 
 Bernardine Sisters of St. Francis

Catholic female orders and societies